Falaknuma is a palace in Hyderabad, Telangana, India. It originally belonged to the Paigah family, and was later owned by the Nizam of Hyderabad. It is on a hillock and covers a  area in Falaknuma,  from Charminar.

It was built by Nawab Sir Viqar-ul-Umra, Prime Minister of Hyderabad and the uncle & brother-in-law of the sixth Nizam. Falak-numa means "Like the Sky" or "Mirror of Sky" in Urdu.

Design
An English architect William Ward Marret designed the palace. Sir Vicar's monogram "VO" is on the furniture, walls and ceiling of the palace.

The palace was built in the shape of a scorpion with two stings spread out as wings in the north. The middle part is occupied by the main building and the kitchen, Gol Bangla, Zenana Mehal, and harem quarters stretch to the south. The Nawab was an avid traveller, and his influences show in the architecture, which combines Italian and Tudor influences.

History

Sir Viqar-ul-Umra, the Prime Minister of Hyderabad, after a visit to Europe, decided to build a European styled residence for himself. The foundation stone for the construction was laid by Sir Vicar on 3 March 1884.  It took nine years to complete the construction and furnish the palace. Sir Vicar moved into the Gol Bangla and Zanana Mahel of the Falaknuma Palace in December 1890 and closely monitored the finishing work at the Mardana portion.

He used the palace as his private residence until the palace was handed over to the 6th Nizam of Hyderabad around 1897–1898.

In the spring of 1897, the sixth Nizam of Hyderabad, Mir Mahbub Ali Khan was invited to stay at the palace. He extended his stay to a week, then a fortnight, and then a month, which prompted Sir Viqar to offer it to him.

The Nizam used the palace as a guest house for the royal guests visiting the kingdom of Hyderabad. The list of royal visitors included King George V, Queen Mary, Edward VIII and Tsar Nicholas II. The palace fell into disuse after the 1950s. The last important guest was the President of India, Rajendra Prasad, in 1951.

The palace was then restored after being leased by the Taj Group of Hotels. The restoration, which began in 2000, took ten years, and was managed by Princess Esra, the first wife of Mukarram Jah. Now, the hotel is again used to host guests in Hyderabad, such as Aga Khan IV, Ivanka Trump and Narendra Modi.

Palace architecture

One of the highlights of the palace is the state reception room, where the ceiling is decorated with frescoes. The ballroom contains a two-ton manually operated organ said to be the only one of its kind in the world The palace has 60 rooms and 22 halls. It has considerable collections of the Nizam's artifacts including paintings, statues, furniture, manuscripts, books, an extensive jade collection, and Venetian chandeliers.

It has a library with a carved walnut roof, a replica of the one at Windsor Castle. The library houses more than five thousand books. It has an extensive collection of English, Urdu and Persian books as well as copies of the Quran, and rare first editions.

The dining hall can seat 101 guests. The chairs are made of carved rosewood with green leather upholstery.

Burroughs and Watts from England designed two identical billiards tables, one of which is in Buckingham Palace and the other in the palace's billiards room.

The palace was the private property of the Nizam family, and not normally open to the public, until 2000.

Renovation into a luxury hotel 
In 2000, Taj Hotels started renovating and restoring the palace. The renovated hotel was opened in November 2010.

In popular culture
 Scenes of films like Radhe Shyam and K.G.F: Chapter 2 were shot inside Falaknuma Palace.

References

External links

 Sydney Morning Herald article
 Taj Falaknuma
 Nizam used to have enough pearls to pave Piccadilly

Hyderabad State
Heritage structures in Hyderabad, India
Royal residences in India
Taj Hotels Resorts and Palaces
Heritage hotels in India
Hotels established in 2010
Tourist attractions in Hyderabad, India
Houses completed in 1889
Hotels in Hyderabad
Palaces of Nizams of Hyderabad
Neoclassical architecture in India
Palaces of Paigah of Hyderabad